Tukroo is a village, situated between Keegam and Shopian which is  away from Pulwama district,  from Shopian district, and  from state summer capital Srinagar. Its district headquarters are located in Shopian district in Indian administered state of Jammu and Kashmir.

Demographics
According to a survey conducted by 2011 Census of India, there are 134 householders residing in Tukroo village which further diversifies into the total population of 829, of which 409 are males and 420 are females. The total area of this village is 76.9 hectares which is the 78th smallest village by area in Shopian.

References 

Villages in Shopian district
Shopian district